Warwick Green (born 27 December 1966) is a writer and a former Australian rules footballer who played with St Kilda in the Victorian Football League (VFL).		

Since retiring from football Warwick Green has worked as a journalist and a freelance writer. He has been a journalist and sports editor with The Age, the Sunday Age and the Herald Sun. He has co-written the autobiographies of Jim Stynes, Kurt Fearnley and Neale Daniher. The Neale Daniher book, When All is Said & Done, won the Biography of the Year Award at the 2020 Australian Book Industry Awards.

Green and his wife Tif have three children.

Books
My Journey (with Jim Stynes, 2012)
Walk Tall: The Young Readers' Edition of the Jim Stynes Autobiography, My Journey (with Jim Stynes, 2014)
Pushing the Limits: Life, Marathons & Kokoda (with Kurt Fearnley, 2014)
When All is Said & Done (with Neale Daniher, 2019)

References

External links 		
		
			
		
		
Living people		
1966 births		
Australian rules footballers from Victoria (Australia)		
St Kilda Football Club players
People educated at Wesley College (Victoria)
Australian sportswriters